Gerald "Gerry" Hillringhaus (born 22 June 1962 in Munich) is a former German footballer.

Hillringhaus made 17 appearances for FC Bayern München during the 1991–92 Bundesliga campaign.

Hillringhaus also scored September 1989's  for SV Türk Gücü München.

References

External links 
 

1962 births
Living people
Footballers from Munich
German footballers
Association football goalkeepers
Bundesliga players
2. Bundesliga players
TSV 1860 Munich players
1. FC Kaiserslautern players
FC Bayern Munich footballers
FC Schalke 04 players
Tennis Borussia Berlin players
Türkgücü München players